The 1991–92 East Tennessee State Buccaneers basketball team represented East Tennessee State University during the 1991-92 NCAA Division I men's basketball season. The team was led by 2nd year coach Alan Leforce. The Bucs finished the season 24–7 and 12–2 in Southern Conference play to finish in 1st place. They won the Southern Conference tournament championship in Asheville to receive the automatic berth to the NCAA tournament as the No. 14 seed in the Southeast region. They upset No. 3 Arizona in the 1st round and then lost to No.2 Michigan in the 2nd round.

Roster

Source

Schedule and results

Source

References

East Tennessee State Buccaneers men's basketball seasons
East Tennessee State
East Tennessee State
East Tennessee
East Tennessee